Manzato is a surname. Notable people with the surname include:

Daniel Manzato (born 1984), Swiss ice hockey player
Franco Manzato (born 1966), Italian politician

Surnames of Italian origin